Filip Palgut (born ) is a Slovak male volleyball player. He is part of the Slovakia men's national volleyball team. On club level he plays for Posojilnica Aich/Dob.

References

External links
 profile at FIVB.org

1991 births
Living people
Slovak men's volleyball players
Place of birth missing (living people)
Sportspeople from Bratislava